Queen's Park  is a park situated on the south side of the city of Glasgow, Scotland, between Strathbungo, Shawlands, Battlefield, Mount Florida, and Crosshill The  park lies about  south of the city centre, and gives its name to a nearby railway station and several other local businesses and institutions, including the football team Queen's Park F.C.

History 

The lands of the park were part of the lands of Langside, belonging to the Maxwells of Pollok. During the 17th Century, the western part was sold to form Camphill Farm. This was sold again in 1799 to Glasgow manufacturer Robert Thomson who built , which still stands at the edge of the park grounds. His son purchased the adjacent Pathhead Farm in 1834, and the merged land was sold by grandson Neale Thomson to Glasgow Corporation in 1857 for the purpose of developing Glasgow's third park.

The park was developed in the late 19th century in response to the increasing population density of Glasgow in general, and the South Side in particular, with the growth of tenement housing supplying the increased demand for middle-class homes. Victorian Glasgow took the provision of open spaces extremely seriously, with the result that parks such as Queen's Park sprang up across the city. It is surrounded by several residential city districts, mostly consisting primarily of tenements, namely Battlefield, Crosshill, Crossmyloof, Govanhill, Langside, Shawlands and Strathbungo. The buildings of the Glasgow Victoria Infirmary hospital (both the 19th and 21st century facilities) are also nearby.

The park was designed by Sir Joseph Paxton, also responsible for noted public parks in London, Liverpool, Birkenhead and the grounds of the Spa Buildings at Scarborough. The original plans for the park included a winter garden and an artificial loch, but these were considered too extravagant and were removed in amended plans developed by the city architect, John Carrick. The park was dedicated to the memory of Mary, Queen of Scots - Mary lost the Battle of Langside near the park, and the park given its present name in place of the original 'South Side Park'.

In 2008 local resident Moira Jones was abducted outside her home and killed in the park, and this crime and the hunt for the killer were given considerable media coverage In 2014, several thousand women marched through the park and surrounding streets at night to highlight and protest against several sexual assaults which had occurred in the area over the preceding months during hours of darkness. However, further rare but serious incidents of a similar nature occurred following that event.

Current usage 
Today the park is used by many thousands of people annually, and remains a focal point for the people of the South Side of Glasgow and beyond. The park holds the regular farmers markets and a wide range of family events, many of these in the redeveloped bandstand which is now known as Queen's Park Arena. The park also contains a wide range of leisure and sports areas and facilities. Since 2019, 'Queen's Parkrun', a weekly free 5 km event, has taken place in the park every Saturday morning at 9.30am.

Both buildings are Category A listed.

The tennis courts are managed by Queens Park Community Tennis Club and Glasgow City Council who funded the refurbished tennis courts in 2015.

The park is popular in snowy weather, when the public make use of the park's steep hills for sledging.

From various points of the park, it is possible to view the full expanse of Glasgow in a given direction. The most comprehensive viewpoint is marked by a flagpole, and affords views of tens of miles to the north, east and south.  In good visibility this view encompasses the Campsie Fells. Although the current viewfinder indicates that Ben Lomond is visible, this is incorrect. What is actually visible are the twin summits of Stob Binnein and Ben More by Crianlarich. Ben Lomond is further west, and would be completely obscured behind the Kilpatrick Hills, if they themselves were not hidden behind nearby trees.

Archaeology
Excavations in 1951 revealed 14th century pottery. By comparison with similar archaeological sites in the area, it is suggested by Eric J Talbot, then of Glasgow University, that this was a Norman ringwork earth and timber castle.

See also
 Glasgow Golf Club

References

External links

 Queens Park Churches
 Southside Festival
 Life in the Southside of Glasgow
 Glasgow City Council Queen's Park information page
 Friends of Queen's Park Glasgow
 Queen's Park Arena

Parks and commons in Glasgow
Urban public parks
Areas of Glasgow
Tennis in Scotland
Govanhill and Crosshill